EveryoneOn is a national non-profit organization working to eliminate the digital divide through partnerships with the technology industry, content creators, libraries and other organizations to deliver free and affordable technology and training to all Americans.



History 

In a May 2011 speech, FCC Chairman Julius Genachowski challenged the technology industry to help close the adoption gap. In response, a group of Internet service providers, technology companies and nonprofits collaborated to establish a public-private effort targeting the digital divide. This new initiative, announced as “Connect to Compete” by Genachowski on October 12, would focus on providing families meeting certain eligibility criteria with affordable Internet and computer offers for their homes. In his remarks, Genachowski stated that “having one-third of [21st century] Americans sitting on the [broadband] sidelines is as unthinkable as having one-third of our country without electricity in the 20th century.”

Connect to Compete, or Connect2Compete as it soon came to be known, was initially housed at the D.C.-based nonprofit organization One Economy Corporation. Ben Hecht, President and CEO of Living Cities, assumed the role of Board Chairman and helped C2C secure grants from the Carlos Slim Foundation, the Knight Foundation and the Wasserman Foundation to support the initiative in tandem with the commitments made by computer and software companies, training centers, and high-speed internet providers.

On March 21, 2013, C2C launched EveryoneOn, an Ad Council public service campaign intended to motivate Internet non-adopters to become connected and direct them to no-cost digital literacy training in their communities. The campaign's primary objective is helping the 60+ million unconnected Americans and encourages individuals age-23+ who are non- or limited Internet users to "do something better online."

Just over three weeks later, on April 16, 2013, Chicago Mayor Rahm Emanuel announced his city's intention to serve as a pilot locale in the EveryoneOn campaign. Emanuel called the program as "a great example of the public and the private sectors working together to craft innovative solutions to prepare our workforce for the global economy.”

References

External links 
 EveryoneOn - official site
 Connect2Compete - official site
 FCC Chairman Julius Genachowski's Speech on Public-Private Broadband Adoption Initiative Connect2Compete
 Zachary Leverenz, CEO, Connect2Compete
 EveryoneOn Launches in Chicago
 Multi-Sector partnership connects Philly to Affordable Broadband, Computers
 Connect2Compete CEO Zach Leverenz speaks at the Cox Virginia C2C ribbon cutting in Alexandria, Virginia
 Mike Bloomberg Speaks at the Launch of EveryoneOn NY

Non-profit technology
Digital divide